The 2011–12 Nashville Predators season was the club's 14th season in the National Hockey League (NHL).

Off-season
On June 22, 2011, the Predators revealed a new team logo, secondary logo and wordmarks. The Predators new away jerseys were unveiled at the 2011 NHL Entry Draft and their new home jerseys were unveiled at an event on July 13.

Regular season
In November 2011, it was announced that W. Brett Wilson had purchased a 5% interest in the Nashville Predators.

The Predators were involved in some controversy when it was announced that Alexander Radulov would make his return to the Predators after leaving for the Kontinental Hockey League (KHL) in 2008. Radulov, still in his final year of his entry-level contract with the Predators, did not need to clear waivers to return to the Predators.

The Predators finished the season with the league's best power-play percentage at 21.60% (54 for 250).

Playoffs 

The Predators ended the 2011–12 regular season as the Western Conference's fourth seed. They defeated the fifth-seeded Detroit Red Wings in the first round series, 4–1. The Predators lost in the second round to the Phoenix Coyotes. During the series against the Coyotes, Alexander Radulov and Andrei Kostitsyn were suspended by the team for being seen in a bar, breaking curfew.

Standings

Schedule and results

Pre-season

Regular season

Playoffs

Player statistics

Skaters
Note: GP = Games played; G = Goals; A = Assists; Pts = Points; +/− = Plus/minus; PIM = Penalty minutes

Goaltenders
Note: GP = Games played; TOI = Time on ice (minutes); W = Wins; L = Losses; OT = Overtime losses; GA = Goals against; GAA= Goals against average; SA= Shots against; SV= Saves; Sv% = Save percentage; SO= Shutouts

†Denotes player spent time with another team before joining Predators. Stats reflect time with the Predators only.
‡Traded mid-season
Bold/italics denotes franchise record

Awards and records

Awards

Records

Milestones

Transactions 
The Predators have been involved in the following transactions during the 2011–12 season.

Trades

Free agents signed

Free agents lost

Claimed via waivers

Lost via waivers

Player signings

Draft picks 

Nashville's picks at the 2011 NHL Entry Draft in St. Paul, Minnesota.

See also 
 2011–12 NHL season

References

Nashville Predators seasons
N
N